Victor Abens (16 October 1912 – 14 January 1993) was a Luxembourgish politician.

Background and World War Two

Victor Abens was a prominent member of the Luxembourg Socialist Workers' Party.

He was a member of the Lëtzeburger Volleks Legio'n (LVL) resistance group, which fought against the German occupation during the Second World War. In November 1944, he led the successful defense of his hometown Vianden and Vianden Castle against assault by the Waffen SS.

Post-World War Two activities

After the war, he sat in the Chamber of Deputies from 1945, and was mayor of his hometown of Vianden from 1946, before resigning both offices in 1981. He represented the Chamber of Deputies in the Parliamentary Assembly of the Council of Europe Council of Europe from 1964 until 1979 (1964-72 as a substitute). He was elected to the European Parliament in 1979, in which he sat until 1989. He was Vice-President of the Socialist Group from 1984 until 1987.

He died in Liège in 1993, at the age of 80. The street on which Vianden's town hall is located is named after him (Place Abens Victor).

Honours  
 War Cross 1940–1945. 
 Commander of the Order of the Oak Crown 
 Grand Cross Order of Merit of the Federal Republic of Germany (Federal Republic of Germany). 
 Officer of the Order of Orange Nassau (Netherlands). 
 Commander of the Order of the British Empire.

References

1912 births
1993 deaths
Members of the Chamber of Deputies (Luxembourg)
Luxembourg Resistance members
People from Vianden
Luxembourg Socialist Workers' Party MEPs
Luxembourg Socialist Workers' Party politicians
MEPs for Luxembourg 1979–1984
MEPs for Luxembourg 1984–1989
Honorary Commanders of the Order of the British Empire
Commanders Crosses of the Order of Merit of the Federal Republic of Germany